Cernuella neglecta, the dune snail, is a species of small air-breathing land snail, a terrestrial pulmonate gastropod mollusc in the family Geomitridae. 

This is a small snail with a white and brown striped shell. It lives on chalk banks.

Distribution and conservation status
This species is not listed in IUCN red list - not evaluated (NE)

This snail lives in European countries and islands including:
 Czech Republic - Bohemia
 Great Britain - extinct
 Netherlands
 Poland
Spain

References

 Haas, F. (1936). Neue und kritische Arten der Heliciden-Unterfamilie Helicellinae (Moll. Gastr. Pulm.). Zoologischer Anzeiger, 114 (11/12): 297-305. Leipzig 
 Bank, R. A.; Neubert, E. (2017). Checklist of the land and freshwater Gastropoda of Europe. Last update: July 16th, 2017

External links 
 Series of life images at: 
 Draparnaud, J.-P.-R. (1805). Histoire naturelle des mollusques terrestres et fluviatiles de la France. 2 pp. (Avertissement a sa Majesté l'Impératrice), 2 pp. Rapport, i-viii (Préface), 1-164, pl. 1-13, 1 p. Errata

Geomitridae
Gastropods described in 1805